The Minister for Green Skills, Circular Economy and Biodiversity is a junior ministerial post in the Scottish Government. As a result, the minister does not attend the Scottish Cabinet but reports directly to the First Minister of Scotland. The current Minister is Lorna Slater, who was appointed in August 2021 after the Bute House Agreement.

History 
The office was created in August 2021 alongside the Minister for Zero Carbon Buildings, Active Travel and Tenants’ Rights after the Scottish Government agreed a power-sharing deal with the Scottish Green Party.

Overview

Responsibilities
The specific responsibilities of the minister are:

 Green Industrial Strategy
 green skills
 circular economy
 Zero Waste Scotland
 nature recovery targets
 NatureScot
 biodiversity (along with the Minister for Environment, Biodiversity and Land Reform)
 national parks and natural heritage
 plant health
 Serving as a member of Cabinet Sub-Committee on Climate Emergency

List of office holders

References

External links 

Scottish Parliament
Drugs Policy